Jim Wood (born July 27, 1936) is an American former gridiron football player and coach. He played college football at the end position at Oklahoma State University from 1956 to 1958.  He was selected by the American Football Coaches Association as a first-team end on its 1958 College Football All-America Team, and as a third-team player by the Associated Press. At the end of the 1958 season, an experiment was conducted in which data from 145 football coaches was input into a Univac computer to determine who was the best college football player in the country.  The computer ranked Wood as the nation's second best player behind George Deiderich of Vanderbilt.  Wood capped his collegiate career by leading Oklahoma State to a 15–6 victory over Florida State in the 1958 Bluegrass Bowl.

Wood later coached at the collegiate and professional levels, including a five-year stint as the head coach at New Mexico State University in Las Cruces, New Mexico from 1968 to 1972.  He was the head coach for the Calgary Stampeders of the Canadian Football League (CFL) from 1973 to 1975.

Head coaching record

College

References

1936 births
Living people
American football ends
American players of Canadian football
Canadian football ends
BC Lions players
Calgary Stampeders coaches
Calgary Stampeders players
Oklahoma State Cowboys football players
New Mexico State Aggies football coaches
New York Giants scouts
Junior college football coaches in the United States
People from Tonkawa, Oklahoma
Players of American football from Oklahoma